Yuri Vladimirovich Susloparov (14 August 195828 May 2012) was a Soviet football player and manager, born in Kharkiv.

Honours
 Soviet Top League winner: 1987, 1989.
 Soviet Top League bronze: 1986.
 1980 UEFA European Under-21 Football Championship winner.

International career
Susloparov made his debut for USSR on 7 October 1981 in a World Cup qualifier against Turkey. He participated in the 1982 FIFA World Cup finals, coming on as a second-half substitute in the 2–1 defeat by Brazil in Seville.

External links
Profile 
Died Yuri Susloparov (Official site of RFU)
Died the former player of "Torpedo", "Spartak", and the national team

1958 births
2012 deaths
Ukrainian footballers
Soviet footballers
Soviet Union international footballers
1982 FIFA World Cup players
Soviet Top League players
FC Metalist Kharkiv players
FC Karpaty Lviv players
FC Torpedo Moscow players
FC Spartak Moscow players
Ukrainian football managers
Ukrainian expatriate football managers
Expatriate football managers in Bangladesh
Ukrainian expatriate sportspeople in Bangladesh
Footballers from Kharkiv
Association football midfielders
Association football defenders